Van der Sandt is a Dutch and Afrikaans surname. Notable people with the surname include:

Albert van der Sandt Centlivres (1887–1966), South African jurist
Johann van der Sandt, South African academic
Maximilian van der Sandt (1578–1656), Dutch Jesuit theologian

See also

Sandt

Afrikaans-language surnames
Surnames of Dutch origin